A flight cadet is a military or civilian occupational title that is held by someone who is in training to perform aircrew duties in an airplane.  The trainee does not need to become a pilot, as flight cadets may also learn to serve as a bombardier, navigator, or flight engineer.

Flying Cadet Pilot Training Program (USAAS) 
From 1907 to 1947, the army ran this program to train pilots for the US Army Air Service (1918-1926), US Army Air Corps (1926–1941), and US Army Air Force (1941–1947). During America's involvement in World War II (1942–1945), the rank of flight cadet was changed to that of aviation cadet and the program name was changed to the "Aviation Cadet Training Program".

From 1947, this program was run by the now separate US Air Force. The pilot cadet program ended in 1961, but the navigator cadet program ended in 1965.

Naval Aviator Training Program (USN)

Royal Air Force
The Royal Air Force operated a flight cadet scheme at the RAF College Cranwell until 1977.

See also
 Pilot cadetship program
Military ranks